The Serie B of the Brazilian Championship 2016 was a football competition held in Brazil, equivalent to the second division. It was contested by 20 clubs. The top four teams will were promoted to Série A in 2017 and the bottom four were relegated to Série C in 2017.The games had a break during the 2016 Olympics, which was held between July and August in Brazil. The competition had nineteen rounds played before the stoppage.

Atlético Goianiense were the champions.

Teams

20 teams participated in the 2016 edition: the 12 teams from 5th to 16th of the previous (2015) edition of Série B, 4 relegated from 2015 Série A and 4 promoted from 2015 Série C.
Teams in red left the competition this season (either due to a promotion or a relegation). Teams in green joined the competition this season (either due to a promotion or a relegation).

Stadia and locations

Number of teams by state

Personnel and kits

Managerial changes

League table

Results

Top scorers

Attendances

Average home attendances

Final table after all games played.

Source: http://cbf.com.br/competicoes/brasileiro-serie-b

References

Campeonato Brasileiro Série B seasons
Campeonato Brasileiro Série B